P61 is a regional Ukraine road (P-highway) in Sumy Oblast, Ukraine, running mainly west-east and connecting Baturyn with Sumy in a more or less straight line. It begins at Highway M01/European route E101 and passes through Mytchenky, Krasne (Chernihiv Oblast), Popivka, Konotop, Simyanivka, Dubovyazivka, Krasne (Sumy Oblast), Chernecha Sloboda, Terny, Bobryk, Tuchne, Mykolaivka, Stepanivka, and ends in Sumy at Stepana Bandera Street (Highway H07) and Illinska Street (Highway H30/Highway P45). There is also a branch road starting at Highway M03/European route E101 to Hetman's Capital National Park.

Main route

Main route and intersections with other highways in Ukraine.

Hetman's Capital National Park branch.

See also

 Roads in Ukraine
 Ukraine State Highways

External links
Start of P61 road in SumyEnd of P61 road in Baturyn

References 

Roads in Chernihiv Oblast
Roads in Sumy Oblast